Mataroa is a settlement in the Rangitikei District and Manawatū-Whanganui region of New Zealand's North Island.

The area was already settled by the Māori iwi Ngāti Rangi by the time William Colenso made the first recorded European visit in 1845.

Railway surveyors cut a rough track through the district in 1884, and wool farmers began clearing the area in the following decades. The Mataroa Tunnel was dug through the area in the early 1900s. The Main Trunk railway line was laid through it in 1906 and it began to carry trains in 1907.

The Paengaroa Scenic Reserve is located in Mataroa. It includes a carpark, picnicking area, and ten minute walking track.

There were two fatal crashes in Mataroa in 2019.

Education

References

External links 

 1905 photo of the site of Mataroa

Rangitikei District
Populated places in Manawatū-Whanganui